Mike Santiago (born October 1, 1955) is an American football coach. He served as head football coach at Stephen F. Austin State University (SFA) from 1999 to 2004, and the University of the Incarnate Word (UIW) from 2009 through 2011, compiling an overall record of 48 wins and 45 losses. He is currently serving as the head coach of Central Catholic High School in San Antonio.

Head coaching record

References

1955 births
Living people
American football defensive backs
Cleveland Browns scouts
Glendale Gauchos football players
Incarnate Word Cardinals football coaches
Lamar Cardinals football coaches
McNeese Cowboys football coaches
NC State Wolfpack football coaches
Northern Arizona Lumberjacks football coaches
Southern Utah Thunderbirds football players
Players of American football from Baltimore
Stephen F. Austin Lumberjacks football coaches
Texas State Bobcats football coaches
Utah State Aggies football coaches
Western Michigan Broncos football coaches